Apjohnite (IMA symbol: Apj) is a manganese aluminium sulfate mineral with the chemical formula MnAl(SO)·22HO. It was named after Trinity College Dublin professor James Apjohn. Its type locality is Maputo Province, Mozambique.

References

External links 

 Apjohnite data sheet on Webmineral
 Apjohnite on the Handbook of Mineralogy

Manganese(II) minerals
Aluminium minerals
Sulfate minerals